Boning is the practice in American baseball of treating a baseball bat with a bone (typically a cattle femur). The bone is run repeatedly up and down the barrel of the bat. The practice has the benefit of slightly hardening the bat by compressing the surface wood cells, and also (in superstition) of boosting hitting on the grounds that bone and hide go together, thus bone attracts hide, and as the baseball is covered in hide it will be attracted to the boned bat.  

The bone may be bolted to a fixed surface, the bat being moved over the bone rather than the other way around. Sometimes another stationary hard surface is used, or a bottle, as these are just as good at hardening the bat, although not imparting the superstitious benefit. 
 
According to some sources, a harder bat surface, having less "give", experiences less deformation, thus forcing more deformation onto the baseball. The ball, being softer than wood, deforms more, so more kinetic energy is absorbed by the deformation, giving a lower coefficient of restitution to the entire event, and thus less speed of the ball coming off the bat, although the practical effect may be small; see bouncing ball physics. Other sources claim the opposite effect, and no conclusive testing proving the matter either way has been conducted. In any case, bat weight, swing speed, pitch speed, and contact angle are more important factors.

Boning is also held to lengthen bat life by reducing splintering.

Unlike corking, boning is entirely legal under baseball rules. 

Through most of the 20th century, the great majority of major league bats were made of ash wood. In 1997, maple wood bats were permitted in major league games, and became widely used in the 21st century, following the example of home run champion Bobby Bonds. Maple being harder than ash, there is less need for boning. Also, in the early and mid 20th century bats had little factory processing beyond lathing, while modern bats undergo more factory processing, often including hardening and polishing. Consequently, boning is less efficatious and somewhat less common than in the early and mid 20th century.

Sometimes, boning bats would be the duty of the batboy.

References

Baseball culture